Scottish actor Brian Cox has appeared in various films and television series such as Manhunter (1986), Rob Roy and Braveheart (both 1995), The Long Kiss Goodnight (1996), Nuremberg (2000), Super Troopers (2001), The Bourne Identity,  The Ring and Adaptation (all 2002), X2 (2003), Troy (2004), Red Eye (2005), Deadwood (2006), Zodiac (2007), Red (2008), Red (2010), Coriolanus and Rise of the Planet of the Apes (both 2011), Red 2 (2013), Succession (2018–present), Good Omens (2019), and Last Moment of Clarity (2020).

He has also appeared in various theatre productions such as The Music Man (1994), St. Nicholas (1999), Dublin Carol (2000), Uncle Varick (2004), Rock 'n' Roll (2006–2008) That Championship Season (2011), and The Weir (2014).

Films

Television

Television series

Television films

Theatre

Video games

Audio

References

External links
 

Male actor filmographies
British filmographies
Scottish filmographies